Lathudih is a village located in Mohammadabad tehsil of Ghazipur district of Uttar Pradesh in India. It has total 646 families residing. Lathudih has population of 4,080 as per government records. It is located at a distance of 18 km towards east from tehsil headquarter Mohammadabad and 41 km from district headquarter Ghazipur.The total geographical area of village is approximately 440 hectares.

Administration
Lathudih village is administered by Gram Pradhan through its Gram Panchayat, who is elected representative of village as per constitution of India and Panchyati Raj Act. Lathudih comes under Bhawarkol block.

Nearby places
 Karimuddinpur
 Mohammadabad, Ghazipur
 Ghazipur
 Ballia
 Varanasi
 Gondaur
 Parsa, Ghazipur
 Rajapur, Ghazipur

References

External links
Villages in Ghazipur Uttar Pradesh

Villages in Ghazipur district